Kongsuk Sitsarawatsuer (ก้องศึก ศิษย์สารวัตรเสือ) is a Thai Muay Thai fighter.

Titles and accomplishments
Lumpinee Stadium
 2018 Lumpinee Stadium 118 lbs Champion
 2019 Lumpinee Stadium 122 lbs Champion
 2018 Lumpinee Stadium Fighter of the Year
Professional Boxing Association of Thailand (PAT)
 2017 Thailand 115 lbs Champion
 2018 Thailand 118 lbs Champion

Channel 7 Stadium
 2022 Channel 7 Stadium 135 lbs Champion

Fight record

|-  style="background:#cfc;"
| 2023-02-18|| Win ||align=left| Erdal VenumMuayThai || Rajadamnern World Series || Bangkok, Thailand || TKO (Doctor stoppage) || 3 || 2:28 

|-  style="background:#cfc;"
| 2022-12-17|| Win||align=left| Batman Or.Atchariya || Samui Super Fight: Ruamponkon Samui, Phetchbuncha Stadium || Koh Samui, Thailand || Decision ||5 ||3:00 
|-  style="background:#cfc;"
| 2022-11-06|| Win||align=left| Batman Or.Atchariya || Kiatpetch, Channel 7 Stadium || Bangkok, Thailand || Decision ||5 ||3:00 
|-
! style=background:white colspan=9 |
|-  style="background:#cfc;"
| 2022-09-24 || Win ||align=left| Worapon Kiatchachanan || Ruamponkon Samui + Kiatpetch Samui Fight, Petchbuncha Stadium|| Koh Samui, Thailand||Decision ||5  ||3:00 
|-  style="background:#cfc;"
| 2022-09-03 || Win ||align=left| Yok Parunchai || Ruamponkon Samui + Kiatpetch Samui Fight, Petchbuncha Stadium|| Koh Samui, Thailand|| Decision ||5  ||3:00 
|-  style="background:#cfc;"
| 2022-07-03 || Win||align=left| PetchSamui Lukjaoporongtom || Chang MuayThai Kiatpetch Amarin Super Fight, Rajadamnern Stadium|| Bangkok, Thailand|| Decision || 5 || 3:00
|-  style="background:#cfc;"
| 2022-06-11 || Win ||align=left| Darky NokKhao-GorMor.11 || Fairtex Fight, Lumpinee Stadium|| Bangkok, Thailand|| Decision|| 5 ||3:00
|- style="background:#fbb;"
| 2022-05-14|| Loss|| align="left" | PheuThai Por.Panomporn  || TorNamThai TKO Kiatpetch, Sor.Salacheep Stadium || Lopburi province, Thailand || Decision|| 5 ||3:00
|-  style="background:#cfc;"
| 2022-04-04 || Win ||align=left| Rungnapa Pinsinchai  ||Suek Muaydee 4 Pak, Thupatemi Stadium|| Pathum Thani, Thailand|| TKO || 5 ||
|-  style="background:#cfc;"
| 2021-11-13 || Win ||align=left| Fahnamchai Por.Mongkolpsap || Go Sport, Lumpinee Stadium|| Bangkok, Thailand|| Decision|| 5 ||3:00

|-  style="background:#FFBBBB;"
| 2019-10-08 || Loss ||align=left| View Petchkoson || Lumpinee Stadium || Bangkok, Thailand|| Decision || 5 || 3:00
|-  style="background:#FFBBBB;"
| 2019-09-06 || Loss ||align=left| Worawut MUden-BawvyJeans || Lumpinee Stadium || Bangkok, Thailand|| Decision || 5 || 3:00
|-  style="background:#FFBBBB;"
| 2019-05-26 || Loss ||align=left| Chaylar Por.Lakboon|| Channel 7 Boxing Stadium || Bangkok, Thailand|| Decision || 5 || 3:00
|-  style="background:#CCFFCC;"
| 2019-03-19 || Win ||align=left| Worawut Boveejean|| Lumpinee Stadium || Bangkok, Thailand|| Decision || 5 || 3:00 
|-
! style=background:white colspan=9 |
|-  style="background:#CCFFCC;"
| 2019-02-12 || Win ||align=left| View Petchkoson || Lumpinee Stadium || Bangkok, Thailand|| Decision || 5 || 3:00
|-  style="background:#CCFFCC;"
| 2018-12-07 || Win ||align=left| Jakdao Wissanukollakan|| Lumpinee Stadium || Bangkok, Thailand|| Decision || 5 || 3:00 
|-
! style=background:white colspan=9 |
|-  style="background:#CCFFCC;"
| 2018-11-13 || Win ||align=left| Wanmechok Sitnayoktaweepong|| Lumpinee Stadium || Bangkok, Thailand|| Decision || 5 || 3:00
|-  style="background:#CCFFCC;"
| 2018-09-25 || Win ||align=left| Pompetch Sitnumnoi || Lumpinee Stadium || Bangkok, Thailand|| Decision || 5 || 3:00 
|-
! style=background:white colspan=9 |
|-  style="background:#CCFFCC;"
| 2018-09-04 || Win ||align=left| Peemai Erawan || Lumpinee Stadium || Bangkok, Thailand|| Decision || 5 || 3:00 
|-
! style=background:white colspan=9 |
|-  style="background:#CCFFCC;"
| 2018-06-05 || Win ||align=left| Banlangngoen Sawansrangmunja || Lumpinee Stadium || Bangkok, Thailand|| Decision || 5 || 3:00
|-  style="background:#CCFFCC;"
| 2018-04-03 || Win ||align=left| Phetsaitong Sor.Jor.Lekmuangnon || Lumpinee Stadium || Bangkok, Thailand|| KO || 2 ||
|-  style="background:#CCFFCC;"
| 2018-03-06 || Win ||align=left| Boonchana Nayokatasala || Lumpinee Stadium || Bangkok, Thailand|| Decision || 5 || 3:00 
|-
! style=background:white colspan=9 |
|-  style="background:#CCFFCC;"
| 2018-02-06 || Win ||align=left| Donkings Morbestkamala || Lumpinee Stadium || Bangkok, Thailand|| Decision || 5 || 3:00
|-  style="background:#FFBBBB;"
| 2017-12-01 || Loss||align=left| Phetnarin Sitnumnoi || Lumpinee Stadium || Bangkok, Thailand|| Decision || 5 || 3:00
|-  style="background:#CCFFCC;"
| 2017-11-10 || Win ||align=left| Ekkachai Sor.Jor.Lekmuangnon || Lumpinee Stadium || Bangkok, Thailand|| Decision || 5 || 3:00
|-  style="background:#CCFFCC;"
| 2017-08-15 || Win ||align=left| Chokprecha Sitnayokthaweb || Lumpinee Stadium || Bangkok, Thailand|| Decision || 5 || 3:00
|-  style="background:#CCFFCC;"
| 2017-07-18 || Win ||align=left| Sensak Sor.Boongium || Lumpinee Stadium || Bangkok, Thailand|| Decision || 5 || 3:00
|-  style="background:#CCFFCC;"
| 2017-06-20 || Win ||align=left| Patakphet Sinbeemuaythai || Lumpinee Stadium || Bangkok, Thailand|| Decision || 5 || 3:00
|-  style="background:#CCFFCC;"
| 2017-05-21 || Win ||align=left| Dechkhonchon Pangkongprab || Channel 7 Boxing Stadium || Bangkok, Thailand|| Decision || 5 || 3:00
|-  style="background:#CCFFCC;"
| 2017-03-21 || Win ||align=left| Donkings Morbestkamala || Lumpinee Stadium || Bangkok, Thailand|| Decision || 5 || 3:00
|-  style="background:#CCFFCC;"
| 2017-02-19 || Win ||align=left| Brandthai Kelasport ||  || Nonthaburi, Thailand|| Decision || 5 || 3:00
|-  style="background:#FFBBBB;"
| 2017-01-15 || Loss||align=left| Sangdaw Erawan||  || Thailand|| KO || 4 ||
|-  style="background:#CCFFCC;"
| 2016-12-16 || Win ||align=left| Brandthai Kelasport || Lumpinee Stadium || Bangkok, Thailand|| Decision || 5 || 3:00
|-  style="background:#CCFFCC;"
| 2016-09-25 || Win ||align=left| Chalawan Sor.Thanaphet || Channel 7 Boxing Stadium || Bangkok, Thailand|| Decision || 5 || 3:00
|-  style="background:#CCFFCC;"
| 2016-07-23 || Win ||align=left| Wisanuchai Jitmuangnon || Lumpinee Stadium || Bangkok, Thailand|| Decision || 5 || 3:00
|-  style="background:#FFBBBB;"
| 2016-04-05 || Loss||align=left| Tongpoon Sitpanancherng || Siam Boxing Omnoi || Bangkok, Thailand|| KO || 4 ||
|-  style="background:#CCFFCC;"
| 2016-03-15 || Win ||align=left| Panphetlek Kiatjaroenchai || Lumpinee Stadium || Bangkok, Thailand|| Decision || 5 || 3:00
|-  style="background:#CCFFCC;"
| 2016-02-05 || Win ||align=left| Petchbangsaen Sor.Jor.Lekmueangnon || Lumpinee Stadium || Bangkok, Thailand|| Decision || 5 || 3:00
|-  style="background:#FFBBBB;"
| 2015-08-25 || Loss||align=left| Phetsaifon Erawan || Lumpinee Stadium || Bangkok, Thailand|| Decision || 5 || 3:00
|-  style="background:#FFBBBB;"
| 2015-07-07 || Loss||align=left| Dao Parunchai || Lumpinee Stadium || Bangkok, Thailand|| Decision || 5 || 3:00
|-  style="background:#CCFFCC;"
| 2015-06-12 || Win ||align=left| Suddankrai Phetjinda || Lumpinee Stadium || Bangkok, Thailand|| Decision || 5 || 3:00
|-  style="background:#FFBBBB;"
| 2015-05-08 || Loss ||align=left| Panphetlek || Lumpinee Stadium || Bangkok, Thailand|| Decision || 5 || 3:00
|-  style="background:#CCFFCC;"
| 2015-01-07 || Win ||align=left| Ekyala Yuikanchang || Rajadamnern Stadium || Bangkok, Thailand|| Decision || 5 || 3:00
|-
| colspan=9 | Legend:

References

Kongsuk Sitsarawatsuer
Living people
2000 births
Kongsuk Sitsarawatsuer